An electronic lab notebook (also known as electronic laboratory notebook, or ELN) is a computer program designed to replace paper laboratory notebooks.  Lab notebooks in general are used by scientists, engineers, and technicians to document research, experiments, and procedures performed in a laboratory.  A lab notebook is often maintained to be a legal document and may be used in a court of law as evidence.  Similar to an inventor's notebook, the lab notebook is also often referred to in patent prosecution and intellectual property litigation.

Electronic lab notebooks are a fairly new technology and offer many benefits to the user as well as organizations. For example: electronic lab notebooks are easier to search upon, simplify data copying and backups, and support collaboration amongst many users.  
ELNs can have fine-grained access controls, and can be more secure than their paper counterparts.  They also allow the direct incorporation of data from instruments, replacing the practice of printing out data to be stapled into a paper notebook. 
This is a list of ELN software packages. It is incomplete, as a recent review listed 96 active & 76 inactive (172 total) ELN products. Notably, this review and other lists of ELN software often do not include widely used generic notetaking software like Onenote, Notion, Jupyter etc, due to their lack ELN nominal features like time-stamping and append-only editing. Some ELNs are web-based; others are used on premise and a few are available for both environments.

ELN Software

Open-source ELN software

References 

ELN Packages